Edgar Villegas Arce (born November 24, 1994) is a Mexican professional footballer who last played for Real Zamora.

External links
 Édgar Villegas at XOLO 
 

Living people
1994 births
Mexican footballers
Association football midfielders
Club Tijuana footballers
Dorados de Sinaloa footballers
Mineros de Zacatecas players
Irapuato F.C. footballers
Club Celaya footballers
Atlético Reynosa footballers
Liga MX players
Ascenso MX players
Liga Premier de México players
Tercera División de México players
Sportspeople from Tijuana
Footballers from Baja California